H. W. Wright (full name unknown, date of birth and death unknown) was an English first-class cricketer.  Wright made a single first-class appearance for Hampshire in 1885, against the Marylebone Cricket Club.

References

External links
H.W. Wright at Cricinfo
H.W. Wright at CricketArchive

English cricketers
Hampshire cricketers